San Pedro y San Pablo is Spanish for Saint Paul and Saint Peter. It may refer to:

Churches
Iglesia Mayor de San Pedro y San Pablo, San Fernando, Cádiz, Andalusia, Spain
San Pedro y San Pablo Asistencia, Pacifica, California
Mission San Pedro y San Pablo de Bicuñer, near Yuma, Arizona
Mission San Pedro y San Pablo del Tubutama, Tubutama, Sonora, Mexico
San Pedro y San Pablo de Patale, Leon County, Florida

Places
Mexico
San Pedro y San Pablo Ayutla, Oaxaca
San Pedro y San Pablo Teposcolula, Oaxaca
San Pedro y San Pablo Tequixtepec, Oaxaca

Other uses
San Pedro y San Pablo College, Mexico City
San Pedro y San Pablo River, river in Mexico